Aleksandrouli is a Georgian red grape variety.

History
The grape is reputed to be one of the oldest and greatest of the Georgian varieties, but is also reported by the Geilweilerhof database as a selected seedling of Muscat of Alexandria. This may reflect two varieties, the Alexandrouli wine grape and the table grape Alexandriuli Muscat.

Distribution and wines
Used in Georgia to produce a semi-sweet red wine known as Khvanchkara or as a medium bodied, semi-dry, chewy blend (with Mujuretuli) having good acids and claimed to have aroma flavours reminiscent of pomegranates.

Vine and viticulture
The grape seems to prefer the wetter western half of Georgia.

Synonyms
Alexandrouli is also known under the synonyms Aleksandroouly, Aleksandrouli, Aleksandrouli Shavi, Alexandreouli, Alexandroouli, Alexandrouli, Kabistona, and Kabistoni.

See also 
Georgian wine
List of Georgian wine appellations

References

External links
 Picture

Georgian wine
Red wine grape varieties